Elections to Tower Hamlets London Borough Council took place on 6 May 2010, the same day as the 2010 United Kingdom general election. There were 17 wards electing 3 councillors each.

Summary results

Ward results

References

2010
2010 London Borough council elections
May 2010 events in the United Kingdom
21st century in the London Borough of Tower Hamlets